Jamieson–Bennett House is a historic home located at Indianapolis, Marion County, Indiana.  It was built in 1936, and is a -story, Tudor Revival style dwelling sheathed in a limestone veneer.  It has a tiled gable roof, cast stone trim, and leaded glass windows.

It was added to the National Register of Historic Places in 2001.

References

Houses on the National Register of Historic Places in Indiana
Tudor Revival architecture in Indiana
Houses completed in 1936
Houses in Indianapolis
National Register of Historic Places in Indianapolis